The flag of the Autonomous Community of the Canary Islands is a vertical tricolour of three equal bands of white, blue, and yellow. The state flag includes the Coat of arms of the Canary Islands in the central band; the civil flag omits this. The designs were made official by the Statute of Autonomy of the Canarian Autonomous Community (Organic Law 10/82) on 16 August 1982.

History and meaning 
The tricolour flag has its origins in the Canarias Libre movement of the 1960s.  It was designed by Carmen Sarmiento and her sons Arturo and Jesus Cantero Sarmiento, and first displayed (in paper form) on 8 September 1961. It combined the blue and white colours of the Province of Santa Cruz de Tenerife (Province of Canary Islands) with the blue and yellow colours of the Province of Las Palmas.

Colours 
The colours of the flag as specified by the Canarian Government are the following:

*Assumed to be pure white due to it not being specified exactly.

Flags of the provinces 
The Spanish Provinces of Santa Cruz de Tenerife and Las Palmas do not have a flag.

Island flags

Other versions

See also 
 Coat of arms of Canary Islands
 Flag of Tenerife
 Tourism in the Canary Islands

References

External links

Banderas de Canarias by José Manuel Erbez.
Canary Islands Flag - History & Meaning by Guide to Canary Islands

Flags of Spain
Flag
Flag
Canary
Canary Islands
Flags introduced in 1982